The Tan Sri Ainuddin Wahid Mosque is a mosque in Taman Universiti, Skudai, Iskandar Puteri, Johor, Malaysia. The mosque was officially opened on 20 May 2005 by the Tunku Mahkota of Johor at that time, Tunku Ibrahim Ismail Sultan Iskandar and was named after the former Universiti Teknologi Malaysia (UTM) vice-chancellor, Tan Sri Ainuddin Wahid.

History
The mosque was constructed from 2000 and was completed on 31 May 2003.

Architecture
Middle Eastern architecture

See also
 Islam in Malaysia

2003 establishments in Malaysia
Mosques in Johor
Mosques completed in 2003